The Embassy of Moldova in Moscow is the diplomatic mission of Moldova to Russia. The Embassy provides consular services to Moldovan citizens residing or travelling in Russia, Kazakhstan, Kyrgyzstan and Tajikistan.

Ambassadors
Petru Lucinschi (1991—1993)
Anatol Țăranu (1993—1995)
Valeriu Pasat (1995—1997)
Valeriu Bobuțac (1998—2001)
Vladimir Țurcan (2002—2005) 
Vasile Sturza (2006—2008)
Andrei Neguța (2009—2012)
Andrei Galbur (2012—2015)
Dumitru Braghiș (2015—2017)
Andrei Neguța (2017—2020)
Vladimir Golovatiuc (2020—2021)
Lilian Darii (2022—present)

Contacts
 Address: 107031, Moscow, Kuznetskiy Most str., 18/7
 Telepfone: (+7 495) 624 53 53; (+7 495) 624 80 91
 Fax: (+7 495) 624 90 95
 E-mail: moscovamfa.md
 Consular Service: 107031, Moscow, Rozhdestvenka str., 7/18

See also
 List of diplomatic missions of Moldova
 Moldova–Russia relations

References

External links
 Embassy of Moldova in Moscow

Moscow
Moldova
Moldova–Russia relations